Northerner may refer to:

 A person from a Northern Region from a State, Province, or Country; For Example:
 Someone from Northern England
 Someone from the Northern United States
 Translation of Beifangren "北方人", endonym for someone from Northern China
 Northerner (train), in New Zealand
 Northerner (schooner), a shipwreck in Lake Michigan
 The Northerner (newspaper), Fort St. John, British Columbia weekly newspaper
 The Northerner (student newspaper), weekly student newspaper at Northern Kentucky University
 The Northerner (symphony), composer Jeremy Soule's first symphony
 Northerner (Ghana), natives of the three northernmost administrative Regions of Ghana
 Northerners (Korean political faction) of Joseon Period in Korea, resulting from a split in 1590 of the Easterners (Korean political faction)

See also